Ellen Baake (born 1961) is a German mathematical biologist who works as a professor of biomathematics and theoretical bioinformatics at Bielefeld University. Her research uses probability theory and differential equations to study biological evolution; she has also studied mathematical immunobiology and the mathematical modeling of photosynthesis.

Baake earned a diploma in biology in 1985 from the University of Bonn,
and completed her Ph.D. there in theoretical biology in 1989. She earned a habilitation at Ludwig Maximilian University of Munich in 1999 and, after holding faculty positions at several other universities, joined Bielefeld University in 2004.

Baake was an invited speaker at the 2010 International Congress of Mathematicians.

References

1961 births
Living people
21st-century German biologists
20th-century German mathematicians
Women mathematicians
Academic staff of Bielefeld University
21st-century German mathematicians
German women biologists
20th-century German women scientists
21st-century German women scientists